A Long Day's Night is a live album by American hard rock band Blue Öyster Cult, recorded in Chicago, Illinois, on 21 June 2002. It is so named because that day was 2002's summer solstice, the longest day of the year.

The concert was released as a DVD and a CD; the CD does not include seven of the songs included on the DVD-release ("E.T.I.," "Harvester of Eyes," "Flaming Telepaths," "Then Came the Last Days of May," "ME 262" and the encore songs "Dominance and Submission" and "The Red and the Black"), while the CD-release featured "Astronomy", not available on the DVD.

In 2004, 10 tracks from this concert were released again as Extended Versions: The Encore Collection.

CD track listing
"Stairway to the Stars" (Albert Bouchard, Donald Roeser, Richard Meltzer) – 3:53
"Burnin' for You" (Roeser, Meltzer) – 4:39
"O.D.'d on Life Itself" (Eric Bloom, A. Bouchard, Joe Bouchard, Sandy Pearlman) – 4:41
"Dance on Stilts" (Roeser, John Shirley) – 5:49
"Buck's Boogie" (Roeser) – 6:26
"Mistress of the Salmon Salt (Quicklime Girl)" (A. Bouchard, Pearlman) – 4:58
"Harvest Moon" (Roeser) – 4:42
"Astronomy" (J. Bouchard, A. Bouchard, Pearlman) – 10:19
"Cities on Flame With Rock-And-Roll" (Roeser, A. Bouchard, Pearlman) – 5:53
"Perfect Water" (Roeser, Jim Carroll) – 5:22
"Lips in the Hills" (Roeser, Bloom, Meltzer) – 4:22
"Godzilla" (Roeser) – 8:44
"(Don't Fear) The Reaper" (Roeser) – 8:14

DVD track listing
"Stairway to the Stars"
"Burning for You"
"O.D.'d on Life Itself"
"E.T.I. (Extra Terrestrial Intelligence)"
"Dance on Stilts"
"Harvester of Eyes"
"Buck's Boogie"
"Mistress of the Salmon Salt (Quicklime Girl)"
"Flaming Telepaths"
"Harvest Moon"
"Then Came the Last Days of May"
"Cities on Flame with Rock-and-Roll"
"ME 262"
"Perfect Water"
"Lips in the Hills"
"Godzilla"
"(Don't Fear) The Reaper"
"Dominance and Submission"
"The Red and the Black"

Personnel
Eric Bloom – lead vocals, stun guitars, keyboards
Allen Lanier – keyboards, rhythm guitars, some lead guitar on "Then Came The Last Days Of May," background vocals 
Donald "Buck Dharma" Roeser – lead guitars, vocals
Danny Miranda – bass, background vocals
Bobby Rondinelli – drums, percussion

References

Blue Öyster Cult live albums
2002 live albums
2002 video albums
Live video albums
Sanctuary Records live albums
Sanctuary Records video albums